Réaumur can refer to:

 René Antoine Ferchault de Réaumur, a French scientist of the early 18th century
 Réaumur scale, proposed in 1731 by de Réaumur
 Réaumur, Vendée, a commune in the Vendée département of France
 Réaumur (crater), the remains of a lunar impact crater on the southern edge of Sinus Medii